Yamba may refer to:

 Yamba, New South Wales, a port town in Australia
 Yamba, South Australia, a locality in the Riverland
 Yamba Department, one of the six departments of Gourma Province, Burkina Faso
 Yamba, Burkina Faso, a town in Yamba Department
 Yamba, Sudan, a village in Southern Sudan
 Yamba language, spoken in Cameroon
 Yamba Asha, Angolan footballer